Mahonia monyulensis is a shrub in the family Berberidaceae first described as a species in 1961. It is endemic to Tibet.

References

Endemic flora of Tibet
Plants described in 1961
monyulensis